The Wilshire Traditional Orchards Project (WTOP) is an organisation that maps, conserves and restores traditional orchards within Wiltshire, England. Founded in 2008 it is based at the Wiltshire Wildlife Trust headquarters in Devizes. As of January 2010 the project had 200 volunteers.

The project is funded by Natural England Countdown 2010 Biodiversity Action Fund.

Ground truthing
The project undertakes ground truth surveys to determine the reliability and accuracy of national records, age and condition of the orchards and to distinguish between traditional and non-traditional orchards.

The results are published in the People's Trust for Endangered Species National Orchard Inventory. The national inventory is publicly available for download, or can be explored interactively.

References

External links
 Wiltshire Traditional Orchards Project website

Organisations based in Wiltshire
Organizations established in 2008
2008 establishments in England